The National Radical Party may refer to:

 National Radical Party (Greece)
 National Radical Party (Hungary)
 National Radical Party (Serbia)
 National Radical Party (Yugoslavia)

See also
 National Radical Camp (Poland)